Herval Abreu Pais (April 23, 1935 – May 8, 2007), better known by his stage name Herval Rossano, was a Brazilian TV actor and director from Campos dos Goytacazes. He directed both the original 1976 version and the 2004 remake of Isaura the Slave.

He was a cinema actor and his first movie was Luzes nas Sombras in 1952, in which he played a very small role. Despite the small roles in movies and of the little payment he received for them, he participated in two productions every year. Soon he became part of the permanent cast of Multifilmes, becoming the leading man in Eva Wilma, and working with Procópio Ferreira and Maria Vidal.

Filmography

As actor
Cinema
1952: Luzes nas sombras
1952: Destino
1953: O homem dos papagaios
1953: O craque - Dr. Mário
1953: Balança mas não cai
1954: A sogra
1959: Maria 38 - Henrique
1959: Titio não é sopa - Paulo
1959: Eu sou o tal
1959: Dona Xepa
1959: Trágica mentira
1960: A Viúva Valentina - Mário
1961: Samba em Brasília - Valdo
1962: Assassinato em Copacabana - Germano
1962: Quiero morir en carnaval
1962: Três colegas de batina - Aloisio
1963: Sonhando com Milhões - Gervásio
1963: Quero essa mulher assim mesmo
1965: No tempo dos bravos
1975: O casal - Doctor
1975: Amantes, amanhã se houver sol

TV
1968: El litre
1970: Pigmalião 70 - Fábio
1970: Assim na Terra como no Céu - Otto
1973-1974: Carinhoso - Santiago
1974: A Cartomante
1974: Fogo sobre Terra - Artur Braga
1975: Cuca Legal - Fausto
1975: Na Roda Viva da Vida
1977: À Sombra dos Laranjais - Pedro Lemos
1980: As Três Marias
1984: Padre Cícero - Adolfo
1985: A Gata Comeu
1986: Dona Beija
1987: Bambolê - Antenor
1989: República
1991: Salomé
1997: A Justiceira (Episode: Balas perdidas) - Armando Sien Fuegos
1998: Era uma Vez... - Jorge (final appearance)

As director

1958: Uma produção musical de Herval Rossano
1959: Grande teatro leões
1963: Praça onze (TV Rio)
      - Teleteatro de los lunes UCTV
      - Antologia del cuento (153 episodes)
      - Teatro del cuento Calaf
1966: Esta mujer eres tú 
1967: Los dias jóvenes 
1968: Altitud 3200 metros
1975:  
1975: O noviço
1975: 
1975: A Moreninha
1976: Vejo a lua no céu
1976: O Feijão e o Sonho
1976: Escrava Isaura
1977: À Sombra dos Laranjais
1977: Dona Xepa
1977: Sinhazinha Flô
1978: Maria, Maria
1978: A Sucessora
1979: Super Bronco
1979: 
1980: 
1980: Olhai os Lírios do Campo
1981: Ciranda de Pedra
1981: 
1982: La gran mentira 
1982: Vanessa 
1983: El juego de la vida 
1985: A gata comeu
1986: Dona Beija
1986: Novo amor
1986: Tudo ou nada
1986: Mania de querer
1989: Pacto de Sangue
1991: Salomé
1991: O Portador
1994: Caminhos cruzados
1996: Quem É Você?
2004: A Escrava Isaura
2006: 

Director supervisor
 Gina - 1978
 Você Decide - 1994-1998 
 Brava Gente - 2001

As Libreto author
1975: Na roda viva da vida - Caso especial.
1991: O portador - mini series - with José Antonio de Souza.

References

External links

1933 births
2007 deaths
Brazilian male television actors
Brazilian television directors